Cyprián Majerník (24 November 1909, Veľké Kostoľany – 4 July 1945, Prague) was a Slovak painter who worked in Prague; associated with the "Generation of 1909".

Biography

He had his primary education in Pezinok then, in 1924, attended the secondary school in Košice, where he studied economics. After deciding on art as a career, he went to Bratislava to take private lessons from the Expressionist painter . After acquiring the basics, he enrolled at the Academy of Fine Arts, Prague, where he studied under  and Jakub Obrovský. Upon graduation, he settled in Prague.

In 1932, he took a brief trip to Paris, where he came under the influence of Marc Chagall and Giorgio de Chirico. Although he centered his career there, he made numerous trips to Slovakia to visit his family and hold exhibitions.

About this time, he was diagnosed with multiple sclerosis. Nevertheless, his work was energized by his opposition to Fascism. By 1942, this was virtually his only theme, as he protested the prison camps, death marches and other evils perpetrated by the Nazi régime. The figure of Don Quixote was a recurring motif of continued resistance, despite overwhelming odds against success.

Following the Soviet liberation of Prague in May, 1945, the Umělecká beseda (an artists' association) gave him a certificate of political reliability. At that time, he also married his long-time companion, Karla, and applied for an apartment permit. Not long after, he committed suicide by jumping from a window. It is unknown what the immediate cause may have been, but he had recently experienced short bouts of depression, related to the increasing difficulty involved in holding and manipulating brushes.

A major retrospective was held the following year. In 1991, he was posthumously awarded the Order of Tomáš Garrigue Masaryk by President Vaclav Havel. A showing in honor of his 100th birthday was presented at Mirbach Palace in 2009.

Selected paintings

References

Further reading 
 Karel Sorek, Dilo Cypriana Majernika, Vytvarny Odbor Umelecke Besedy, 1946

External links 

More works by Majerník @ Webumania
Cyprián Majerník Gallery @ Muzeum.sk

1909 births
1945 suicides
20th-century Slovak painters
Expressionist painters
People with multiple sclerosis
Recipients of the Order of Tomáš Garrigue Masaryk
Artists who committed suicide
People from Piešťany District
Burials at National Cemetery in Martin
Suicides by jumping in the Czech Republic
Suicides in Czechoslovakia
1945 deaths